Christopher Richard Pontius (born May 12, 1987) is an American former professional soccer player.

Playing career

Youth and college 
Pontius attended and played central midfield for Servite High School.  He played club soccer with the Irvine Strikers.

He played college soccer at the University of California, Santa Barbara, where he was named Big West Conference Offensive Player of the Year in 2007, and Hermann Trophy candidate in 2008.  In 2006, Pontius and the UC Santa Barbara Gauchos won the NCAA Division I Men's Soccer Championship.

Professional 

Despite being originally named to Ventura County Fusion's roster in 2008 along with a number of other Gauchos, he did not appear in any matches for the club.

D.C. United
Pontius was drafted in the first round (7th overall) of the 2009 MLS SuperDraft by D.C. United. He made his professional debut, and scored his first professional goal, on March 22, 2009, in D.C. United's first game of the 2009 MLS season against Los Angeles Galaxy. On May 23, 2010 Pontius scored D.C.'s 2nd goal in the 3–2 victory against Italian giants A.C. Milan. On July 25, 2012 he scored the MLS All-Star's 2nd goal against Chelsea F.C. to equalize their eventual 3–2 win.  Also in 2012, Pontius emerged as D.C. United's leading goal scorer with 10 goals through the first 27 league matches.  On September 14, 2012, D.C. United announced Pontius' signing to a long-term contract extension with the club (terms of the extension are as yet undisclosed).

Pontius has had a career riddled with injuries. In September 2010, he had a hamstring injury that required surgery and ended his season. Again in 2011, his season ended early with a fractured tibia. In 2012, his first injury free season since his debut, he scored a career high 12 goals. Injuries again plagued Pontius in 2013 and he only played in 22 of the 34 matches that year. D.C. United announced in April 2014, that Pontius would again undergo hamstring surgery and would likely miss most of the 2014 season. Pontius eventually returned to the lineup as a substitute on September 10, 2014 with a mere 8 games left in the regular season. He played 182 games, scored 37 goals, and recorded 23 assists for DC.

Philadelphia Union
On December 7, 2015, Pontius was traded to Philadelphia Union for allocation money. Pontius saw a resurgence to form and became a major contributor to the Union's 2016 season as he led the team in scoring with 12 goals from 34 appearances on the left wing. This return to form earned him the 2016 MLS Comeback Player of the Year.

LA Galaxy
Pontius signed as a free agent with LA Galaxy in January 2018. Pontius's contract with LA Galaxy concluded at the end of their 2018 season. He re-signed with the club on December 19.  Pontius announced his retirement from professional soccer on October 29, 2019.

International 
On December 22, 2009, Pontius received his first call up to train with the senior U.S. national team. Training in Carson, California began for Pontius and the other players called up on January 4, 2010, leading up to a friendly match against Chile. On August 29, 2011, Pontius was called up by the U.S. National Team for friendlies against Costa Rica and Belgium. Pontius made his debut for the national team on January 29, 2017 as a substitute in a friendly against Serbia.

Career statistics

Honors

Club 
UC Santa Barbara
 NCAA Division I Men's Soccer Tournament: 2006

D.C. United
 Lamar Hunt U.S. Open Cup: 2013

Individual 
 Big West Conference Offensive Player of the Year: 2007
 Comeback Player of the Year: 2016 
 MLS All-Star: 2012
 MLS All-Star MVP: 2012
 MLS Best XI: 2012

References

External links 

 DC United player profile
 
 UC Santa Barbara player profile

1987 births
Living people
People from Yorba Linda, California
Sportspeople from Orange County, California
Association football midfielders
American soccer players
UC Santa Barbara Gauchos men's soccer players
D.C. United players
Philadelphia Union players
LA Galaxy players
Soccer players from California
D.C. United draft picks
Major League Soccer players
Major League Soccer All-Stars
United States men's international soccer players
Servite High School alumni
2017 CONCACAF Gold Cup players
CONCACAF Gold Cup-winning players